LEAF Festival is produced by LEAF Community Arts, a non-profit organization established to build community and enrich lives through the arts, locally and globally, through festivals, events, mentoring, and educational programs. When LEAF was created in 1995, it was an acronym for "Lake Eden Arts Festival". As of 2012, we no longer use the origin except as a historical reference- it has transformed into LEAF Community Arts often referred to as "LEAF". LEAF has several signature programs including: LEAF Festival, LEAF Schools & Streets, LEAF International, LEAF Downtown AVL, and LEAF Local.

Occurring twice a year since 1995, LEAF Festival, based in Black Mountain, North Carolina has established a reputation as being one of the best festivals in the southeast. The Washington Post recognized it in 2001 as, "The best cultural Mix and Match Festival in the nation". The festival includes international and local music, handcrafts, dancing, cuisine, children's activities, outdoor adventures, drum circles, a zipline, canoeing, etc.

The home of LEAF, Lake Eden Events & Camp Rockmont, has an intriguing history. Prior to becoming a camp, in the 1940s it was the site of the historic Black Mountain College (BMC). Many of the century's most celebrated artists and thinkers attended the college as teachers or students: Albert Einstein, Robert Rauschenberg, Anni Albers, Merce Cunningham, Rothko and Buckminster Fuller (who designed the first geodesic dome there). Prior to BMC, in the early 1900s, Edwin Wiley Grove (of the Grove Park Inn and Grove Arcade) developed the land and constructed some buildings with his trademark native stone fireplaces. Prior to  Grove, The Lake Eden Inn and Resort offered a getaway for people seeking its healing waters and rejuvenating air.

LEAF in Schools & Streets is a non-profit collaborative outreach program bringing performing artists into schools and community centers for hands-on workshops, residencies, and interactive performances. The experience provides opportunities for youth to perform alongside resident artists on a national stage, with family members in the audience. The program provides participating youth with a diverse experience that includes workshops, performances, interactions with performing artists, and a festival adventure.

2020 saw both festivals go virtual.

Notable performers

 Aaran Bebe Sukura – Ghana
 Abigail Washburn - Clawhammer banjo
 Alex Torres y Orquesta Los Reyes Latinos – South America
 BeauSoleil - Louisiana
 Bela Fleck
 Ben Sollee- genre-bending percussive cellist
 The Be Good Tanyas - Canadian Folk 
 Bernie Worrell & The Woo Warriors
 Billy Jonas – Folk
 Bohola- Irish
 Buckwheat Zydeco
 Carnavalito – Puerto Rico & El Salvador
 Chirgilchin - Throat Singers - Tuva
 Chuck Beattie & Blues By Design
 Chuck Brodsky - Folk
 Clarence "Gatemouth" Brown - Blues
 Corey Harris - Blues
 Cutumba - Cuba
 Cyril Neville's Tribe 13- New Orleans
 Dan Electro & the Silvertones
 Dan Hicks & the Hot Licks
 David Holt Band
 David Wilcox - Folk
 The Dead Poets
 Deer Clan Singers w/ Pura Fé – Native American
 Dervish – Ireland
 Donna the Buffalo
 Duckbutter w/ Sam Bush & John Cowan
 Eileen Ivers & Immigrant Soul - Celtic
 Emeline Michele – Haiti
 Enter The Haggis- Celtic
 Fairport Convention - England
 File' – Louisiana
 Fishbone - punk
 Foundation Stone - Reggae
 Freddie Branch and the Singing Stars
 Fuego Del Almo – Colombia
 The Ghillies - Scotland
 Gokh-Bi System – Senegal
 The Greencards- Bluegrass
 Havana Select - Cuba
 The Holmes Brothers - Soul
 Inlakesh – Australia
 Inner Visions Reggae -Virgin Islands
 Ivan Neville's Dumpstaphunk- New Orleans
 Jamuna – Russia
 Jean-Paul Samputu & Ingeli - Rwanda
 Jeff Oster – Jazz HypnoGroove
 Katuah Capoeira Angola - Brazill
 Kruger Brothers - Switzerland
 Le Vent du Nord – Canada
 Les Nubians - France
 Linda Thompson - England
 Llan de Cubel - Spain
 Lloyd Cannady & The Flying Clouds
 Lonesome River Band - Bluegrass
 Los Amigos Invisibles - Venezuela
 Los Hombres Calientes – New Orleans
 The Mahotella Queens – South Africa
 Mamadou Diabaté - Kora player - Mali
 Mambo Brothers - Latin
 Marcia Ball – Louisiana R& B
 Maria Muldaur & Blusiana Band - Folk
 Martha Redbone
 Michael Franti – Hip Hop
 New Orleans Klezmer All Stars
 Niyaz – Traditional, Folk, Ethnic
 Odetta – Folk Icon
 The Persuasions
 Ralph Stanley & The Clinch Mountain Boys
 Rebirth Brass Band – New Orleans
 Red Stick Ramblers- New Orleans
 Ricardo Lemvo & Makina Loco – Congo/Cuba
 Richie Havens – Folk Icon
 Rising Appalachia- World Music/Spoken Word/Bluegrass
 Robin & Linda Williams & Their Fine Group
 Samba Ngo - Congo
 Samite - Uganda
 Scythian - Celtic Rock with Gypsy flavor
 Shringara Nepal
 Solazo – South America
 Spaceman Jones- Asheville NC
 The Subdudes – New Orleans
 Thomas Mapfumo & The Blacks Unlimited – Zimbabwe
 Tim O'Brien - Folk
 Tony Trischka Band - Bluegrass
 Toubab Krewe
 Viva Quetzel – South America
 The Wailers Band - Reggae
 Wild Asparagus – Contra & Celtic
 Wild Magnolias – New Orleans
 Wild Mango - Latin
 Xumantra – Tibetan
 Yerba Buena - Cuba
 Yungchen Lhamo - Tibet
 Zulu Connection

References

Further reading

External links
 
 

Music festivals in North Carolina
Tourist attractions in Buncombe County, North Carolina
Festivals established in 1995
1995 establishments in North Carolina